Meyerasaurus is an extinct genus of rhomaleosaurid known from Holzmaden, Baden-Württemberg of southwestern Germany.

Description
 
Meyerasaurus is known from the holotype SMNS 12478, articulated and complete skeleton which preserved the skull, exposed in ventral view. It was collected from the Harpoceras elegantulum-falciferum ammonoid subzones, Harpoceras falcifer zone, of the famous Posidonien-Schiefer lagerstätte (Posidonia Shale), dating to the early Toarcian stage of the Early Jurassic, about 183-180 million years ago.

Etymology
Meyerasaurus was first named by Adam S. Smith and Peggy Vincent in 2010 and the type species is Meyerasaurus victor. It was originally classified as a species of Plesiosaurus, later as the second named species of Thaumatosaurus (defunct name, meaning "wonder reptile") and ultimately as a species of Eurycleidus or Rhomaleosaurus. The generic name honors the German palaeontologist Hermann von Meyer for proposing the generic name Thaumatosaurus.

Classification
 
The cladogram below shows Meyerasaurus phylogenetic position among other plesiosaurs, following Benson et al. (2012).

See also

 List of plesiosaur genera
 Timeline of plesiosaur research

References

Rhomaleosaurids
Early Jurassic plesiosaurs of Europe
Toarcian life
Posidonia Shale
Fossil taxa described in 2010
Articles containing video clips
Sauropterygian genera